Mae Rai is a village and tambon (subdistrict) of Mae Chan District, in Chiang Rai Province, Thailand. In 2005 it had a population of 8,072 people. The tambon contains eight villages.

References

Tambon of Chiang Rai province
Populated places in Chiang Rai province